Kohleria warszewiczii is a species of flowering plant in the family Gesneriaceae, native to Colombia. It has gained the Royal Horticultural Society's Award of Garden Merit.

References

Gesnerioideae
Endemic flora of Colombia
Plants described in 1865